Ayub Daud (born 24 February 1990) is a Somali professional footballer who plays as a forward or attacking midfielder for the Somalia national team.

Club career
The son of Daud Hussein, a former member of the Somalia national team, Daud was born in Somalia, and moved to Cuneo, Italy with his family at the age of five.

He joined the Juventus youth sector in 2000 and made his debut with the Primavera (under-20) squad in the 2007–08 season. Daud was part of the Juventus squad in the 2009 Torneo di Viareggio, where he was praised as one of the best footballers of the tournament. He scored 20 goals, and was named top scorer of the tournament.

On 14 March 2009, he made his first team debut with Juventus, replacing Sebastian Giovinco during the final minutes of a Serie A 4–1 win over Bologna.

On 6 August 2009, Daud left Juventus and joined Crotone on loan. The youngster endured a difficult time at the southern Italian club, and subsequently returned to Juventus in January of the following year. He was then loaned out to Serie C1 club Lumezzane. On 25 January 2011 he left for Gubbio on loan. Daud left Italy in August 2013 to join Hungarian club Budapest Honvéd.

International goals

References

1990 births
Living people
Sportspeople from Mogadishu
Association football forwards
Somalian footballers
Somalia international footballers
Juventus F.C. players
F.C. Crotone players
F.C. Lumezzane V.G.Z. A.S.D. players
Cosenza Calcio players
A.S. Gubbio 1910 players
FC Chiasso players
Budapest Honvéd FC players
Serie A players
Serie B players
Nemzeti Bajnokság I players
Somalian expatriate footballers
Expatriate footballers in Italy
Expatriate footballers in Switzerland
Expatriate footballers in Hungary
Somalian expatriate sportspeople in Italy
Somalian expatriate sportspeople in Switzerland
Somalian expatriate sportspeople in Hungary